Casthorpe is hamlet in the civil parish of Barrowby and the South Kesteven District of Lincolnshire, England.

History
There are two medieval sites at Casthorpe, defining the two former settlements of East and West Casthorpe, both recorded in 14th-century subsidy rolls. East Casthorpe, with no evidence apart from earlier maps, was sited at or around Casthorpe Lodge. West Casthorpe, was sited at Casthorpe House Farm, evidenced by aerial photographs faintly showing earthworks, enclosures, ridges and furrows, cropmarks, a possible moat, and possible crofts. Both settlements are mentioned in the Domesday Book, listed as "Caschingetorp", "Chaschingetorp", "Chaschintorp" and "Kaschingetorp" as four probable manors covering the Casthorpe settlement.

Kelly's Directory listed, as the only trades in Casthorpe, three farmers in 1855, two farmers in 1885, and one farmer in 1933. The 1872 White's Directory listed three farmers who were also graziers.

In 2002 Charles Richard Ferens of Casthorpe Lodge became High Sheriff of Lincolnshire.

Geography
Casthorpe is a settlement of three farms, two rows of converted cottages, Longmeadow House and Casthorpe Lodge. The Grantham Canal is at the south of the hamlet, crossed by Casthorpe Bridge. The Old Beck, a stream which runs north from the Grantham Canal, flows through the east of Casthorpe below Casthorpe Hills, eventually reaching the River Witham at Marston as the Foston Beck. A public footpath in the south of Casthorpe runs from the Grantham Canal, then along and over Old Beck, then east at the south of Casthorpe Lodge, ascends Casthorpe Hills, then to Westry Corner at the south of Barrowby. A second public footpath at the north starts at Longmeadow House on Woolsthorpe Lane at the west of Casthorpe, runs east through Casthorpe Farm, over Denton Lane, past Coe Farm, across the Old Beck, then ascends Casthorpe Hills, finishing at the north of the churchyard of All Saints Church, Barrowby.

Landmarks
There are four listed structures in Casthorpe. The two-storey Casthorpe Farm House on Denton Lane is of brick, partly rendered, and dating to the early 18th century. Casthorpe Farmhouse on Casthorpe Road is a rendered and whitewashed two-storey house dating to c.1800 with an adjoining single storey range. Casthorpe Lodge on Casthorpe Road is a two-storey L-plan former farmhouse dating to c1770, with an early 19th-century U-shape Ha-ha.

References

External links
 
 "Barrowby Neighbourhood Plan Area", South Kesteven District Council, showing Casthorpe at the southwest of the parish. Retrieved 17 January 2019
 "Rambling through the hills and dales", Boston Standard, 10 February 2004, referring to Casthorpe history. Retrieved 17 January 2019
 "Casthorpe Hill", VeloViewer, Casthorpe Road hill incline in the west of Casthorpe. Retrieved 17 January 2019

Hamlets in Lincolnshire
South Kesteven District